Ross Oakley Armstrong Sr. (February 4, 1905 – January 3, 1990) was an American football and basketball player and coach. He served as the head football coach at Chadron State College in Chadron, Nebraska from 1938 to 1952. Armstrong was also the head basketball coach at Chadron State from 1935 to 1950, tallying a mark of 157–76.

As a college athlete, Armstrong played football and basketball at the University of Iowa.

Head coaching record

Football

References

External links
 

1905 births
1990 deaths
Chadron State Eagles athletic directors
Chadron State Eagles football coaches
Chadron State Eagles men's basketball coaches
Iowa Hawkeyes football players
Iowa Hawkeyes men's basketball players
People from Poweshiek County, Iowa
Players of American football from Iowa
Basketball players from Iowa
American men's basketball players
Basketball coaches from Iowa